Following is a list of all Article III United States federal judges appointed by President Calvin Coolidge during his presidency. In total, Coolidge appointed 82 Article III federal judges, surpassing the previous record of 80 appointed by Theodore Roosevelt. These included one Justice to the Supreme Court of the United States, 17 judges to the United States Courts of Appeals, and 64 judges to the United States district courts.

Coolidge appointed judges to various Article I specialty courts as well, including Genevieve R. Cline, who became the first woman named to the Federal judiciary when Coolidge placed her on the United States Customs Court in 1928. Among Coolidge's Article I Federal judicial appointments are 2 judges to the United States Court of Customs Appeals (later the United States Court of Customs and Patent Appeals), 4 judges to the United States Court of Claims, 1 member of the Board of General Appraisers (later the United States Customs Court) and 2 judges to the United States Customs Court.

United States Supreme Court justices

Courts of appeals

District courts

Specialty courts (Article I)

United States Court of Customs Appeals
The United States Court of Custons Appeals became the United States Court of Customs and Patent Appeals on March 2, 1929.

United States Court of Claims

United States Customs Court
The Board of General Appraisers became the United States Customs Court on May 28, 1926.

Notes

Renominations

References
General

 

Specific

Sources
 Federal Judicial Center

Coolidge

Presidency of Calvin Coolidge